Slavko Marić (Serbian Cyrillic: Славко Марић; born 7 March 1984) is a retired Serbian professional footballer who played as a defender. He is one of the most capped Serbian SuperLiga players with over 250 appearances.

Honours
Hajduk Beograd
 Second League of Serbia and Montenegro: 2003–04
Mladost Lučani
 Serbian First League: 2006–07
 Serbian Cup: Runner-up 2017–18

External links
 
 
 

Association football defenders
Association football midfielders
Erovnuli Liga players
Expatriate footballers in Georgia (country)
Expatriate footballers in Greece
FC Dila Gori players
First League of Serbia and Montenegro players
FK Borac Čačak players
FK Hajduk Beograd players
FK Jagodina players
FK Mačva Šabac players
FK Mladost Lučani players
FK Novi Pazar players
FK Radnički 1923 players
FK Sloboda Užice players
PAS Lamia 1964 players
People from Goražde
Serbian expatriate footballers
Serbian expatriate sportspeople in Georgia (country)
Serbian expatriate sportspeople in Greece
Serbian First League players
Serbian footballers
Serbian SuperLiga players
Serbs of Bosnia and Herzegovina
1984 births
Living people